was a  after Tenpyō-hōji and before Jingo-keiun. This period spanned the years from January 765 through August 767.

Change of era
 765 : The new era name was created to mark an event or series of events. The previous era ended and the new one commenced in Tenpyō-hōji 9, on the 7th day of the 1st month of 765.

Events of the Tenpyō-jingo era
 765 (Tenpyō-jingo 1, 2nd month): The empress raised the Buddhist priest Dōkyō  to the position of Daijō-daijin.
 765 (Tenpyō-jingo 1): The udaijin Fujiwara no Toyonari died at age 62.
 766 (Tenpyō-jingo 2,  1st month): Fujiwara no Matate is named udaijin; and Kibi no Makibi becomes dainagon.

Notes

References
 Brown, Delmer M. and Ichirō Ishida, eds. (1979).  Gukanshō: The Future and the Past. Berkeley: University of California Press. ;  OCLC 251325323
 Nussbaum, Louis-Frédéric and Käthe Roth. (2005).  Japan encyclopedia. Cambridge: Harvard University Press. ;  OCLC 58053128
 Titsingh, Isaac. (1834). Nihon Odai Ichiran; ou,  Annales des empereurs du Japon.  Paris: Royal Asiatic Society, Oriental Translation Fund of Great Britain and Ireland. OCLC 5850691
 Varley, H. Paul. (1980). A Chronicle of Gods and Sovereigns: Jinnō Shōtōki of Kitabatake Chikafusa. New York: Columbia University Press. ;  OCLC 6042764

External links
 National Diet Library, "The Japanese Calendar" -- historical overview plus illustrative images from library's collection

Japanese eras
8th century in Japan
765 beginnings
767 endings